Llywelyn ap Madog  was  Dean of St Asaph until 1357 ; and then Bishop of St Asaph from then until  his death in 1375.

References 

14th-century Welsh people
Deans of St Asaph
1375 deaths
Bishops of St Asaph